József Halmay is a Hungarian sprint canoeist who competed in the mid-1950s. He won a gold medal in the C-2 10000 m event at the 1954 ICF Canoe Sprint World Championships in Mâcon.

References

Hungarian male canoeists
Living people
Year of birth missing (living people)
ICF Canoe Sprint World Championships medalists in Canadian
20th-century Hungarian people